Thryallis noguerai is a species of beetle in the family Cerambycidae. It was described by Chemsak and McCarty in 1997.

References

Anisocerini
Beetles described in 1997